The women's 1500 metres event at the 2014 Asian Games was held at the Incheon Asiad Main Stadium, Incheon, South Korea on 29 September.

Schedule
All times are Korea Standard Time (UTC+09:00)

Records

Results

 Betlhem Desalegn of the United Arab Emirates originally got the 4th place, but was disqualified because of her biological passport abnormalities.

References

Results

1500 metres women
2014 women